Ballochia rotundifolia is a species of plant in the family Acanthaceae. It is endemic to Socotra.  Its natural habitat is subtropical or tropical dry forests.

References

Endemic flora of Socotra
rotundifolia
Data deficient plants
Taxonomy articles created by Polbot
Taxa named by Isaac Bayley Balfour